Marc Verbeeck (born 14 October 1968) is a Belgian freestyle swimmer. He competed in three events at the 1992 Summer Olympics.

References

External links
 

1968 births
Living people
Belgian male freestyle swimmers
Olympic swimmers of Belgium
Swimmers at the 1992 Summer Olympics
People from Wilrijk